This is a list of members of the Northern Territory Legislative Assembly from 2020 to 2024, as elected at the 2020 election.

 Robyn Lambley resigned from the Territory Alliance party on 21 October 2020, approximately two months after the 2020 election, where she was elected under the Territory Alliance banner. She currently sits in the parliament as an independent.
 Mark Turner was removed from the Labor Party caucus on 18 February 2021, but remained a member of the party.
 Country Liberal MLA for Daly Ian Sloan resigned on 19 August 2021. Labor member Dheran Young won the by-election to replace him on 11 September 2021.
 Chief minister and Labor MLA for Fannie Bay Michael Gunner resigned on 27 July 2022. Labor member Brent Potter won the by-election to replace him on 20 August 2022.

See also
2020 Northern Territory general election

References

Members of Northern Territory parliaments by term
21st-century Australian politicians